Joseph Jacobs Sr. (born 5 December 1937) is a male former boxer who competed for England.

Boxing career
He represented England and won a bronze medal in the -63.5 Kg division at the 1958 British Empire and Commonwealth Games in Cardiff, Wales. He made his professional debut on 12 December 1960 and fought in five fights until 1961.

Personal life
His son Joey Jacobs repeated his Commonwealth Games achievement in 1986.

References

1937 births
Living people
English male boxers
Commonwealth Games medallists in boxing
Commonwealth Games bronze medallists for England
Boxers at the 1958 British Empire and Commonwealth Games
Light-welterweight boxers
Medallists at the 1958 British Empire and Commonwealth Games